Tessel Tina Middag (born 23 December 1992) is a Dutch footballer who plays as a midfielder for Rangers in the Scottish Women's Premier League and the Dutch national team, representing the country at the 2015 FIFA Women's World Cup. She previously played for ADO Den Haag, AFC Ajax, Manchester City, West Ham United, and Fiorentina.

Club career

ADO Den Haag
Middag joined ADO Den Haag in 2011. During her debut season, she scored ten goals in eighteen matches. Middag also won the Eredivisie and KNVB Women's Cup with ADO Den Haag.

Ajax
Middag signed with AFC Ajax in 2012. She made 94 appearances for the club, during which she scored 15 goals and again won the KNVB Women's Cup in 2014.

Manchester City
On 3 June 2016, Manchester City announced they had signed Middag. She made her debut for the club after being brought off the bench against Liverpool on 30 June and was voted Player of the Match by the Official Supporters Club. She made her first start for the club on 2 July against Aston Villa and scored a goal in the first half of match. In May 2017, Middag suffered an ACL injury during a Spring Series match against Reading. After nine months out, Middag made her return on 21 March 2018, entering as an 81st minute substitute in a Champions League quarter-final against Linköpings FC. Middag left Manchester City at the end of the 2017–18 season upon the expiry of her contract having made three appearances in her final season with the team.

West Ham United
On 14 July 2018, Middag joined West Ham United. However, Middag but did not play during the 2018–19 season after sustaining a second ACL injury picked up while on international duty in summer 2018. Initially taking the #6 shirt, Middag changed to #23 ahead of the 2019–20 season having never worn #6. This was partly because the number had already been retired by the men's team in honour of Bobby Moore but also because it represented Middag's "fresh start" with the team following her long-term injury.

Fiorentina
On 30 July 2020, Middag signed for Serie A side Fiorentina.

Rangers
In August 2021, Middag joined Scottish club Rangers.

International career
During 2010 and 2011, Middag made 17 appearances for the Netherlands U19 team. She broke into the senior squad in 2012, in a 2–1 friendly defeat by France. A member of the 31-player provisional squad for UEFA Women's Euro 2013, she was not selected for the final 23-player list. Middag was part of the Netherlands squad in the 2015 FIFA Women's World Cup.

International goals
Scores and results list the Netherlands goal tally first.

* Note: Match not considered as an official friendly.

Honours
ADO Den Haag
 Eredivisie: 2011–12
 KNVB Women's Cup: 2011–12

Ajax
 KNVB Women's Cup: 2013–14

Manchester City
 FA WSL: 2016
 FA WSL Cup: 2016

Rangers
 Scottish Women's Premier League: 2021–22
 Scottish Women's Premier League Cup: 2022
 City of Glasgow Woman's Cup: 2022

References

External links

Profile at Onsoranje.nl (in Dutch)
Profile at vrouwenvoetbalnederland.nl (in Dutch)
Profile at uefa.com
Profile at mancity.com
 

1992 births
Living people
Footballers from Amsterdam
Dutch women's footballers
Netherlands women's international footballers
Eredivisie (women) players
AFC Ajax (women) players
2015 FIFA Women's World Cup players
Women's association football midfielders
ADO Den Haag (women) players
Women's Super League players
Manchester City W.F.C. players
West Ham United F.C. Women players
Fiorentina Women's F.C. players
Rangers W.F.C. players
Expatriate women's footballers in England
Dutch expatriate sportspeople in England
Dutch expatriate sportspeople in Scotland
Dutch expatriate women's footballers
Dutch expatriate sportspeople in Italy
Expatriate women's footballers in Italy
Scottish Women's Premier League players
Expatriate women's footballers in Scotland